Ma Anand Yashu (9 October 1956 – 3 December 2007) was an Indian-Spanish flautist. She performed in a duo with Toti Soler in the early 1980s and was based in Barcelona for many years. In 2001, her album Shanti Shanti topped the New Age Chart in the United States. She returned to Goa in 2003, where she died of cancer in 2007.

References

Indian flautists
Spanish flautists
1956 births
2007 deaths
Indian expatriates in Spain
Deaths from cancer in India
20th-century Indian musicians
20th-century Spanish musicians
Women flautists
20th-century women musicians
20th-century flautists